Events in the year 1624 in Japan.

Incumbents
Monarch: Go-Mizunoo

Births
January 9 - Empress Meishō (d. 1696)

References

 
1620s in Japan
Japan
Years of the 17th century in Japan